IBall or iBall can refer to:

IBall (company), a consumer electronics company headquartered in Andheri, Mumbai, India
iBall (toy), a kinetic toy that displays Newton's Laws

See also
I, Ball, a shoot'em up computer game
Iballë, a village in Albania
"iBalls", an episode of iCarly